Kim Yun-mi (김윤미, born April 23, 1982) is a South Korean shooter. She is a member of the national shooting team. She won the gold medal in both the individual and the team competition of 10m air pistol at the 2010 Asian Games in Guangzhou. Her win of a gold medal this time was particularly notable as she was seven months pregnant at the time.

Awards
2010 The 16th Guangzhou Asian Games Women's 10m Air Pistol gold medal
2010 The 16th Guangzhou Asian Games Women's 10m Air pistol Team gold medal
2008 The 1st Hanhwa national shooting championship Women's 10m air pistol winner
2008 Bonghwanggi national women's 25m pistol gold medal
2007 Asian Championship 10m air pistol team 3rd place
2007 Asian Championship 10m air pistol team 2nd place

Career
2010 a member of the national shooting team for 16th Guangzhou Asian Games Women's shooting
2008 a member of the national shooting team for 29th Beijing Olympic Women's shooting

References

South Korean female sport shooters
Living people
1982 births
Olympic shooters of South Korea
Shooters at the 2008 Summer Olympics
Asian Games medalists in shooting
Shooters at the 2010 Asian Games
Asian Games gold medalists for South Korea
Medalists at the 2010 Asian Games
20th-century South Korean women
21st-century South Korean women